Rose Island is a small island in the Bahamas that lies  east of Paradise Island, which lies directly off of New Providence Island. The island has no formal residential infrastructure and no roads. The center  was owned by Claude Turner for around 36 years up until 2005. The largest mass of the island is made up of a shallow inland lagoon in the center of the island.

The island was home to a pineapple plantation centuries ago.

The island's coast was the filming location for the crash-landing of a Vulcan Bomber in the 1965 James Bond film Thunderball.

References

Islands of the Bahamas